The existing Bangladeshi honours system was created after Independence of Bangladesh. The most highest civilian honours are the Independence Award and Ekushey Padak. They are awarded every year. The  awards are civilian awards for a broad set of achievements in fields such as Education, Arts, Civil Service, or Social Service and Liberation War. Awards were also bestowed posthumously and they are not given for foreign citizens.

The most recognized and respected gallantry awards are the Bir awards which are Bir Sreshtho, Bir Uttom, Bir Bikrom and Bir Protik in decreasing order of importance. They are awarded to  freedom fighters who showed utmost bravery and fought against the Pakistan Army in the Bangladesh Liberation War. All of these awards were introduced immediately after the Liberation War in 1971.

The 'Nakeeb Padak' (Bangla :  নকীব পদক) has been awarded since 2021 for the contribution to Bengali literature.

Civil decorations

General awards 

  Independence Day Award; the highest civilian award
  Ekushey Padak;  the second-highest civilian award

Literature awards 

 Bangla Academy Award, for contribution in the field of Bengali language and literature.
 Shishu Academy Award, for contribution in the field of juvenile literature.

Particular awards 

 National Professor; for outstanding contribution on the field of education.
 Shilpakala Padak; for contributions to the fields of Bangladeshi arts, theater, music, dance, instrumental music, folk music and film.
 Begum Rokeya Padak; for contribution to Gender equality and Women's rights.
 National Agriculture Awards; given to recognise a substantial contribution in the field of research in agricultural development.
 National Film Awards; for notable contributions to the promotion of the art of cinema.
 National Sports Awards (Bangladesh); for specific contributions in the field of games and sports.
 National Family Planning Awards
 National Child Award
 National Youth Awards
 National Cooperative Award
 President's Award for Industrial Development
 National Environment Award
 Public Administration Award

Military decorations 

The following are the various gallantry, service and war medals of the Bangladesh Armed Forces.

Wartime gallantry awards 

  Bir Sreshtho-(literally, "The Most Valiant Hero"), the highest gallantry award 
  Bir Uttom- (literally, "Better among Braves"), the second highest gallantry award 
  Bir Bikrom- (literally, "Valiant hero"), the third highest gallantry award 
  Bir Protik- (literally, "Symbol of Bravery or Idol of Courage"), the fourth highest gallantry award

Peacetime gallantry awards 

 Bir Sorbottam-(literally, "The Foremost Braves"), the highest gallantry award 
 Bir Mrittunjoee- (literally, "The Immortal Braves"), the second highest gallantry award 
 Bir Chiranjib- (literally, " The Incorruptible Braves"), the third highest gallantry award 
 Bir Durjoy- (literally, "The Indomitable Braves"), the fourth highest gallantry award

Army service medals 

  Army Medal সেনাবাহিনী পদক (PSB)
  Extraordinary Service Medal
  Distinguished Service Medal
 Army Medal of Glory সেনা গৌরব পদক (SGP)
 Army Medal of Excellence সেনা উৎকর্ষ পদক (SUP)
 Army Efficiency Medal সেনা পারদর্শিতা পদক (SPP)

Long service awards 

  Jestha Padak I (10 years service)
  Jestha Padak II (20 years service)
  Jestha Padak III (27 years service)

Special decorations (for non-nationals) 

  Bangladesh Freedom Honour -(); the highest award for foreigners or non nationals,
  Bangladesh Liberation War Honour -(); the second highest award for foreigners or non nationals
   Friends of Liberation War Honour -(); the third highest award for foreigners or non nationals

Police medals 

Police medals are awarded every year in the annual Police Week Parade. They are awarded both for bravery and service.

  Bangladesh Police Medal (Bravery)
  Bangladesh Police Medal (Service)
  President Police Medal (Bravery)
  President Police Medal (Service)

Border Guard medals 

  Border Guard Bangladesh Padak (Bravery)
  President Border Guard Padak (Bravery)
 Border Guard Bangladesh Padak (Service)
 President Border Guard Padak (Service)
  Bi-Centennial Padak
  Naf Padak

Ansar and VDP medals 

  Bangladesh Ansar Medal (Bravery)
                      Bangladesh Ansar Medal (Service) 
  President Ansar Medal (Bravery)
                      President Ansar Medal (Service)
  Bangladesh VDP Medal (Bravery)
                      Bangladesh VDP Medal (Service)
  President VDP Medal (Service)

See also 

Military awards and decorations of Bangladesh
Awards and decorations of the Bangladesh Liberation War

References

External links 
 

Bangladesh and the Commonwealth of Nations